James Neal Lamoreaux (May 3, 1889February 6, 1954) was an American politician from Michigan.

Early life
J. Neal Lamoreaux was born on May 3, 1889 in Comstock Park, Michigan to parents James E. Lamoreaux and Lizzie Lamoreaux. J. Neal graduated from  McLachlan Business College in Grand Rapids, Michigan. J. Neal was of French ancestry.

Career
Lamoreaux was involved in the dairy business. On November 8, 1932, Lamoreaux was elected to the Michigan Senate where he represented the 17th district from January 1, 1933 to January 1, 1935. Lamoreaux was defeated when he attempted re-election in 1934. On November 3, 1936, Lamoreaux was re-elected to the state senate, where he represented the same district again from January 1, 1937 to January 1, 1939. In 1938 and 1940, Lamoreaux was defeated for re-election to the state senate. In 1944, unsuccessfully ran for the United States House of Representatives representing Michigan's 5th congressional district. That same year, Lamoreaux served as a presidential elector.

Personal life
On September 26, 1916, Lamoreaux married Georgia Geneski. Lamoreaux was a member of the Elks and the Maccabees. Lamoreaux was Catholic.

Death
Lamoreaux died on February 6, 1954.

References

1889 births
1954 deaths
1944 United States presidential electors
American people of French descent
Catholics from Michigan
People from Kent County, Michigan
Democratic Party Michigan state senators
20th-century American politicians